The de Havilland DH.98 Mosquito is a British twin-engined, shoulder-winged, multirole combat aircraft, introduced during the Second World War. Unusual in that its frame was constructed mostly of wood, it was nicknamed the "Wooden Wonder", or "Mossie". Lord Beaverbrook, Minister of Aircraft Production, nicknamed it "Freeman's Folly", alluding to Air Chief Marshal Sir Wilfrid Freeman, who defended Geoffrey de Havilland and his design concept against orders to scrap the project. In 1941, it was one of the fastest operational aircraft in the world.

Originally conceived as an unarmed fast bomber, the Mosquito's use evolved during the war into many roles, including low- to medium-altitude daytime tactical bomber, high-altitude night bomber, pathfinder, day or night fighter, fighter-bomber, intruder, maritime strike, and photo-reconnaissance aircraft. It was also used by the British Overseas Airways Corporation  as a fast transport to carry small, high-value cargo to and from neutral countries through enemy-controlled airspace. The crew of two, pilot and navigator, sat side by side. A single passenger could ride in the aircraft's bomb bay when necessary.

The Mosquito FB Mk. VI was often flown in special raids, such as Operation Jericho (an attack on Amiens Prison in early 1944), and precision attacks against military intelligence, security, and police facilities (such as Gestapo headquarters). On 30 January 1943, the 10th anniversary of Hitler being made chancellor and the Nazis gaining power, a morning Mosquito attack knocked out the main Berlin broadcasting station while Hermann Göring was speaking, taking his speech off the air.
 
The Mosquito flew with the Royal Air Force (RAF) and other air forces in the European, Mediterranean, and Italian theatres. The Mosquito was also operated by the RAF in the Southeast Asian theatre and by the Royal Australian Air Force  based in the Halmaheras and Borneo during the Pacific War. During the 1950s, the RAF replaced the Mosquito with the jet-powered English Electric Canberra.

Development

By the early to mid-1930s, de Havilland had built a reputation for innovative high-speed aircraft with the DH.88 Comet racer. Later, the DH.91 Albatross airliner pioneered the composite wood construction used for the Mosquito. The wooden monocoque construction not only saved weight and compensated for the low power of the de Havilland Gipsy Twelve engines used by this aircraft, but also simplified production and reduced construction time.

Air Ministry bomber requirements and concepts
Aviation firms entered heavy designs with new high-powered engines and multiple defensive turrets, leading to the production of the Avro Manchester and Handley Page Halifax.

In May 1937, as a comparison to P.13/36, George Volkert, the chief designer of Handley Page, put forward the concept of a fast, unarmed bomber. Support existed in the RAF and Air Ministry; Captain R. N. Liptrot, Research Director Aircraft 3, appraised Volkert's design, calculating that its top speed would exceed that of the new Supermarine Spitfire, but counter-arguments held that although such a design had merit, it would not necessarily be faster than enemy fighters for long. The ministry was also considering using nonstrategic materials for aircraft production, which, in 1938, had led to specification B.9/38 and the Armstrong Whitworth Albemarle medium bomber, largely constructed from spruce and plywood attached to a steel-tube frame. The idea of a small, fast bomber gained support at a much earlier stage than is sometimes acknowledged, though the Air Ministry likely envisaged it using light alloy components.

Inception of the de Havilland fast bomber

Based on his experience with the Albatross, Geoffrey de Havilland believed that a bomber with a good aerodynamic design and smooth, minimal skin area, would exceed the P.13/36 specification. Furthermore, adapting the Albatross principles could save time. In April 1938, performance estimates were produced for a twin Rolls-Royce Merlin-powered DH.91, with the Bristol Hercules (radial engine) and Napier Sabre (H-engine) as alternatives. On 7 July 1938,  de Havilland wrote to Air Marshal Wilfrid Freeman, the Air Council's member for Research and Development, discussing the specification and arguing that in war, shortages of aluminium and steel would occur, but supplies of wood-based products were "adequate." Although inferior in tension, the strength-to-weight ratio of wood is equal to or better than light alloys or steel, hence this approach was feasible.

A follow-up letter to Freeman on 27 July said that the P.13/36 specification could not be met by a twin Merlin-powered aircraft and either the top speed or load capacity would be compromised, depending on which was paramount. De Havilland believed that a compromise, including eliminating surplus equipment, would improve matters. On 4 October 1938, de Havilland projected the performance of another design based on the Albatross, powered by two Merlin Xs, with a three-man crew and six or eight forward-firing guns, plus one or two manually operated guns and a tail turret.

Still believing this could be improved, and after examining more concepts based on the Albatross and the new all-metal DH.95 Flamingo, de Havilland settled on designing a new aircraft that would be aerodynamically clean, wooden, and powered by the Merlin, which offered substantial future development. The new design would be faster than foreseeable enemy fighter aircraft, and could dispense with a defensive armament, which would slow it and make interception or losses to antiaircraft guns more likely. Instead, high speed and good manoeuvrability would make  evading fighters and ground fire easier. The lack of turrets simplified production, reduced drag, and reduced production time, with a delivery rate far in advance of competing designs. Without armament, the crew could be reduced to a pilot and navigator. Whereas contemporary RAF design philosophy favoured well-armed heavy bombers, this mode of design was more akin to the German philosophy of the Schnellbomber. At a meeting in early October 1938 with Geoffrey de Havilland and Charles Walker (de Havilland's chief engineer), the Air Ministry showed little interest, and instead asked de Havilland to build wings for other bombers as a subcontractor.

By September 1939, de Havilland had produced preliminary estimates for single- and twin-engined variations of light-bomber designs using different engines, speculating on the effects of defensive armament on their designs. On 20 September, in another letter to Wilfrid Freeman, de Havilland wrote "...we believe that we could produce a twin-engine[d] bomber which would have a performance so outstanding that little defensive equipment would be needed." On 7 October 1939, a month into the war, the nucleus of a design team under Eric Bishop moved to the security and secrecy of Salisbury Hall to work on what was later known as the DH.98. For more versatility, Bishop made provision for four 20 mm cannon in the forward half of the bomb bay, under the cockpit, firing via blast tubes and troughs under the fuselage.

The DH.98 was too radical for the ministry, which wanted a heavily armed, multirole aircraft, combining medium bomber, reconnaissance, and general-purpose roles, that was also capable of carrying torpedoes. With the outbreak of war, the ministry became more receptive, but was still sceptical about an unarmed bomber. They thought the Germans would produce fighters that were faster than had been expected. and suggested the incorporation of two forward- and two rear-firing machine guns for defence. The ministry also opposed a two-man bomber, wanting at least a third crewman to reduce the work of the others on long flights. To appease the ministry, de Havilland built mock-ups with a gun turret just aft of the cockpit, but apart from this compromise, de Havilland made no changes.

On 12 November, at a meeting considering fast-bomber ideas put forward by de Havilland, Blackburn, and Bristol, Air Marshal Freeman directed de Havilland to produce a fast aircraft, powered initially by Merlin engines, with options of using progressively more powerful engines, including the Rolls-Royce Griffon and the Napier Sabre.

On 12 December, the Vice-Chief of the Air Staff, Director General of Research and Development, and the Air Officer Commanding-in-Chief (AOC-in-C) of RAF Bomber Command met to finalise the design and decide how to fit it into the RAF's aims. The AOC-in-C would not accept an unarmed bomber, but insisted on its suitability for reconnaissance missions with F8 or F24 cameras. After company representatives, the ministry, and the RAF's operational commands examined a full-scale mock-up at Hatfield on 29 December 1939, the project received backing. This was confirmed on 1 January 1940, when Freeman chaired a meeting with Geoffrey de Havilland, John Buchanan (Deputy of Aircraft Production), and John Connolly (Buchanan's chief of staff). De Havilland claimed the DH.98 was the "fastest bomber in the world ... it must be useful". Freeman supported it for RAF service, ordering a single prototype for an unarmed bomber to specification B.1/40/dh, which called for a light bomber/reconnaissance aircraft powered by two  Rolls-Royce RM3SM (an early designation for the Merlin 21) with ducted radiators, capable of carrying a  bomb load. Maximum service ceiling was to be .

On 1 March 1940, Air Marshal Roderic Hill issued a contract under Specification B.1/40, for 50 bomber-reconnaissance variants of the DH.98; this contract included the prototype, which was given the factory serial E-0234. In May 1940, specification F.21/40 was issued, calling for a long-range fighter armed with four 20 mm cannon and four .303 machine guns in the nose, after which de Havilland was authorised to build a prototype of a fighter version of the DH.98. After debate, it was decided that this prototype, given the military serial number W4052, was to carry airborne interception (AI) Mk IV equipment as a day and night fighter. By June 1940, the DH.98 had been named "Mosquito". Having the fighter variant kept the Mosquito project alive, as doubts remained within the government and Air Ministry regarding the usefulness of an unarmed bomber, even after the prototype had shown its capabilities.

Project Mosquito

With design of the DH.98 started, mock-ups were built, the most detailed at Salisbury Hall, where E-0234 was later constructed. Initially, the concept was for the crew to be enclosed in the fuselage behind a transparent nose (similar to the Bristol Blenheim or Heinkel He 111H), but this was quickly altered to a more solid nose with a conventional canopy.

Work was cancelled again after the Battle of Dunkirk, when Lord Beaverbrook, as Minister of Aircraft Production, decided no production capacity remained for aircraft like the DH.98, which was not expected to be in service until early 1942. Beaverbrook told Air Vice-Marshal Freeman that work on the project should stop, but he did not issue a specific instruction, and Freeman ignored the request. In June 1940, however, Lord Beaverbrook and the Air Staff ordered that production should concentrate on five existing types, namely the Supermarine Spitfire, Hawker Hurricane fighter, Vickers Wellington, Armstrong-Whitworth Whitley, and Bristol Blenheim bombers. Work on the DH.98 prototype stopped. Apparently, the project shut down when the design team were denied materials for the prototype.

The Mosquito was only reinstated as a priority in July 1940, after de Havilland's general manager, L.C.L. Murray, promised Lord Beaverbrook 50 Mosquitoes by December 1941. This was only after Beaverbrook was satisfied that Mosquito production would not hinder de Havilland's primary work of producing Tiger Moth and Airspeed Oxford trainers, repairing Hurricanes, and manufacturing Merlin engines under licence. In promising Beaverbrook such a number by the end of 1941, de Havilland was taking a gamble, because they were unlikely to be built in such a limited time. As it transpired, only 20 aircraft were built in 1941, but the other 30 were delivered by mid-March 1942. During the Battle of Britain, interruptions to production due to air raid warnings caused nearly a third of de Havilland's factory time to be lost. Nevertheless, work on the prototype went ahead quickly at Salisbury Hall since E-0234 was completed by November 1940.

In the aftermath of the Battle of Britain, the original order was changed to 20 bomber variants and 30 fighters. Whether the fighter version should have dual or single controls, or should carry a turret, was still uncertain, so three prototypes were built: W4052, W4053, and W4073. The second and third, both turret armed, were later disarmed, to become the prototypes for the T.III trainer. This caused some delays, since half-built wing components had to be strengthened for the required higher combat loading. The nose sections also had to be changed from a design with a clear perspex bomb-aimer's position, to one with a solid nose housing four .303 machine guns and their ammunition.

Prototypes and test flights
On 3 November 1940, the prototype aircraft, painted in "prototype yellow" and still coded E-0234, was dismantled, transported by road to Hatfield and placed in a small, blast-proof assembly building. Two Merlin 21 two-speed, single-stage supercharged engines were installed, driving three-bladed de Havilland Hydromatic constant-speed controllable-pitch propellers. Engine runs were made on 19 November. On 24 November, taxiing trials were carried out by Geoffrey de Havilland Jr., the de Havilland test pilot. On 25 November, the aircraft made its first flight, piloted by de Havilland Jr., accompanied by John E. Walker, the chief engine installation designer.

For this maiden flight, E-0234, weighing , took off from the grass airstrip at the Hatfield site. The takeoff was reported as "straightforward and easy" and the undercarriage was not retracted until a considerable altitude was attained. This problem persisted for some time. The left wing of E-0234 also had a tendency to drag to port slightly, so a rigging adjustment, i.e., a slight change in the angle of the wing, was carried out before further flights.

The pilot noticed this most in the control column, with handling becoming more difficult. During testing on 10 December, wool tufts were attached to suspect areas to investigate the direction of airflow. The conclusion was that the airflow separating from the rear section of the inner engine nacelles was disturbed, leading to a localised stall and the disturbed airflow was striking the tailplane, causing buffeting. To smooth the air flow and deflect it from forcefully striking the tailplane, nonretractable slots fitted to the inner engine nacelles and to the leading edge of the tailplane were tested. These slots and wing-root fairings fitted to the forward fuselage and leading edge of the radiator intakes stopped some of the vibration experienced, but did not cure the tailplane buffeting.

In February 1941, buffeting was eliminated by incorporating triangular fillets on the trailing edge of the wings and lengthening the nacelles, the trailing edge of which curved up to fair into the fillet some  behind the wing's trailing edge; this meant the flaps had to be divided into inboard and outboard sections. With the buffeting problems largely resolved, John Cunningham flew W4050 on 9 February 1941. He was greatly impressed by the "lightness of the controls and generally pleasant handling characteristics". Cunningham concluded that when the type was fitted with AI equipment, it might replace the Bristol Beaufighter night fighter.

The original estimates were that as the Mosquito prototype had twice the surface area and over twice the weight of the Spitfire Mk.II, but also with twice its power, the Mosquito would end up being  faster.

On 19 February, official trials began at the Aeroplane and Armament Experimental Establishment (AAEE) based at Boscombe Down, although the de Havilland representative was surprised by a delay in starting the tests. On 24 February, as W4050 taxied across the rough airfield, the tailwheel jammed leading to the fuselage fracturing. Repairs were made by early March, using part of the fuselage of the photo-reconnaissance prototype W4051. In spite of this setback, the Initial Handling Report 767 issued by the AAEE stated, "The aeroplane is pleasant to fly ... aileron control light and effective..."

W4050 continued to be used for various test programmes, as the experimental "workhorse" for the Mosquito family. In late October 1941, it returned to the factory to be fitted with Merlin 61s, the first production Merlins fitted with a two-speed, two-stage supercharger. The first flight with the new engines was on 20 June 1942. Fitted with high-altitude-rated, two-stage, two-speed Merlin 77s, it reached  in December 1943. Soon after these flights, W4050 was grounded and scheduled to be scrapped, but instead served as an instructional airframe at Hatfield. In September 1958, W4050 was returned to the Salisbury Hall hangar where it was built, restored to its original configuration, and became one of the primary exhibits of the de Havilland Aircraft Heritage Centre.

W4051, which was designed from the outset to be the prototype for the photo-reconnaissance versions of the Mosquito, was slated to make its first flight in early 1941. However, the fuselage fracture in W4050 meant that W4051's fuselage was used as a replacement; W4051 was then rebuilt using a production standard fuselage and first flew on 10 June 1941. This prototype continued to use the short engine nacelles, single-piece trailing-edge flaps, and the  "No. 1"  tailplane used by W4050, but had production-standard  wings and became the only Mosquito prototype to fly operationally.

Construction of the fighter prototype, W4052, was also carried out at the secret Salisbury Hall facility. It was powered by  Merlin 21s, and had an altered canopy structure with a flat, bullet-proof windscreen; the solid nose had mounted four .303 British Browning machine guns and their ammunition boxes, accessible by a large, sideways hinged panel. Four 20-mm Hispano Mk.II cannon were housed in a compartment under the cockpit floor with the breeches projecting into the bomb bay and the automatic bomb bay doors were replaced by manually operated bay doors, which incorporated cartridge ejector chutes.

As a day and night fighter, prototype W4052 was equipped with AI Mk IV equipment, complete with an "arrowhead" transmission aerial mounted between the central Brownings and receiving aerials through the outer wing tips, and it was painted in black RDM2a "Special Night" finish. It was also the first prototype constructed with the extended engine nacelles. W4052 was later tested with other modifications, including bomb racks, drop tanks, barrage balloon cable cutters in the leading edge of the wings, Hamilton airscrews and braking propellers, and drooping aileron systems that enabled steep approaches and a larger rudder tab. The prototype continued to serve as a test machine until it was scrapped on 28 January 1946. 4055 flew the first operational Mosquito flight on 17 September 1941.

During flight testing, the Mosquito prototypes were modified to test a number of configurations. W4050 was fitted with a turret behind the cockpit for drag tests, after which the idea was abandoned in July 1941. W4052 had the first version of the Youngman Frill airbrake fitted to the fighter prototype. The frill was mounted around the fuselage behind the wing and was opened by bellows and venturi effect to provide rapid deceleration during interceptions and was tested between January and August 1942, but was also abandoned when lowering the undercarriage was found to have the same effect with less buffeting.

Production plans and American interest
The Air Ministry authorised mass production plans on 21 June 1941, by which time the Mosquito had become one of the world's fastest operational aircraft. It ordered 19 photo-reconnaissance (PR) models and 176 fighters. A further 50 were unspecified; in July 1941,  these were confirmed to be unarmed fast bombers. By the end of January 1942, contracts had been awarded for 1,378 Mosquitoes of all variants, including 20 T.III trainers and 334 FB.VI bombers. Another 400 were to be built by de Havilland Canada.

On 20 April 1941, W4050 was demonstrated to Lord Beaverbrook, the Minister of Aircraft Production. The Mosquito made a series of flights, including one rolling climb on one engine. Also present were US General Henry H. Arnold and his aide Major Elwood Quesada, who wrote "I ... recall the first time I saw the Mosquito as being impressed by its performance, which we were aware of. We were impressed by the appearance of the airplane that looks fast usually is fast, and the Mosquito was, by the standards of the time, an extremely well-streamlined airplane, and it was highly regarded, highly respected."

The trials set up future production plans between Britain, Australia, and Canada. Six days later, Arnold returned to America with a full set of manufacturer's drawings. As a result of his report, five companies (Beech, Curtiss-Wright, Fairchild, Fleetwings, and Hughes) were asked to evaluate the de Havilland data. The report by Beech Aircraft summed up the general view: "It appears as though this airplane has sacrificed serviceability, structural strength, ease of construction and flying characteristics in an attempt to use construction material which is not suitable for the manufacture of efficient airplanes." The Americans did not pursue the proposal for licensed production, the consensus arguing that the Lockheed P-38 Lightning could fulfill the same duties. However, Arnold urged the United States Army Air Forces (USAAF) to evaluate the design even if they would not adopt it. On 12 December 1941, after the attack on Pearl Harbor, the USAAF requested one airframe for this purpose.

Design and manufacture

Overview

While timber construction was considered outmoded by some, de Havilland claimed that their successes with techniques used for the DH 91 Albatross could lead to a fast, light bomber using monocoque-sandwich shell construction. Arguments in favour of this included speed of prototyping, rapid development, minimisation of jig-building time, and employment of a separate category of workforce. The ply-balsa-ply monocoque fuselage and one-piece wings with doped fabric covering would give excellent aerodynamic performance and low weight, combined with strength and stiffness. At the same time, the design team had to fight conservative Air Ministry views on defensive armament. Guns and gun turrets, favoured by the ministry, would impair the aircraft's aerodynamic properties and reduce speed and manoeuvrability, in the opinion of the designers. Whilst submitting these arguments, Geoffrey de Havilland funded his private venture until a very late stage. The project was a success beyond all expectations. The initial bomber and photo-reconnaissance versions were extremely fast, whilst the armament of subsequent variants might be regarded as primarily offensive.

The most-produced variant, designated the FB Mk. VI (Fighter-bomber Mark 6), was powered by two Merlin Mk.23 or Mk.25 engines driving three-bladed de Havilland hydromatic propellers. The typical fixed armament for an FB Mk.

Performance
The design was noted for light and effective control surfaces that provided good manoeuvrability, but required that the rudder not be used aggressively at high speeds. Poor aileron control at low speeds when landing and taking off was also a problem for inexperienced crews. The speed could be reduced to an acceptable  for low-speed flying.

Warning of the stall was given by buffeting and would occur  before stall was reached. The conditions and impact of the stall were not severe. The wing did not drop unless the control column was pulled back. The nose drooped gently and recovery was easy.

Early on in the Mosquito's operational life, the intake shrouds that were to cool the exhausts on production aircraft overheated. Flame dampers prevented exhaust glow on night operations, but they had an effect on performance. Multiple ejector and open-ended exhaust stubs helped solve the problem and were used in the PR.VIII, B.IX, and B.XVI variants.

Fuselage
The oval-section fuselage was a frameless monocoque shell built in two vertically separate halves formed over a mahogany or concrete mould. Pressure was applied with band clamps. Some of the 1/2—3/4" shell sandwich skins comprised 3/32" birch three-ply outers, with 7/16" cores of Ecuadorean balsa. In many generally smaller but vital areas, such as around apertures and attachment zones, stronger timbers, including aircraft-quality spruce, replaced the balsa core. Together with various forms of wood reinforcement, often of laminated construction, the sandwich skin gave great stiffness and torsional resistance. The separate fuselage halves speeded construction, permitting access by personnel working in parallel with others, as the work progressed.

Work on the separate half-fuselages included installation of control mechanisms and cabling. Screwed inserts into the inner skins that would be under stress in service were reinforced using round shear plates made from a fabric-Bakelite composite.
 
Transverse bulkheads were also compositely built-up with several species of timber, plywood, and balsa. Seven vertically halved bulkheads were installed within each moulded fuselage shell before the main "boxing up" operation. Bulkhead number seven was especially strongly built, since it carried the fitments and transmitted the aerodynamic loadings for the tailplane and rudder. The fuselage had a large ventral section cut-out, strongly reinforced, that allowed the fuselage to be lowered onto the wing centre-section at a later stage of assembly.

For early production aircraft, the structural assembly adhesive was casein-based. At a later stage, this was replaced by "Aerolite", a synthetic urea-formaldehyde type, which was more durable. To provide for the edge joints for the fuselage halves, zones near the outer edges of the shells had their balsa sandwich cores replaced by much stronger inner laminations of birch plywood. For the bonding together of the two halves ("boxing up"), a longitudinal cut was machined into these edges. The profile of this cut was a form of V-groove. Part of the edge bonding process also included adding further longitudinal plywood lap strips on the outside of the shells. The half bulkheads of each shell were bonded to their corresponding pair in a similar way. Two laminated wooden clamps were used in the after portion of the fuselage to provide supports during this complex gluing work. The resulting large structural components had to be kept completely still and held in the correct environment until the glue cured.

For finishing, a covering of doped madapollam (a fine, plain-woven cotton) fabric was stretched tightly over the shell and several coats of red, followed by silver dope, were added, followed by the final camouflage paint.

Wing

The all-wood wing pairs comprised a single structural unit throughout the wingspan, with no central longitudinal joint. Instead, the spars ran from wingtip to wingtip. There was a single continuous main spar and another continuous rear spar. Because of the combination of dihedral with the forward sweep of the trailing edges of the wings, this rear spar was one of the most complex units to laminate and to finish machining after the bonding and curing. It had to produce the correct 3D tilt in each of two planes. Also, it was designed and made to taper from the wing roots towards the wingtips. Both principal spars were of ply box construction, using in general 0.25-in plywood webs with laminated spruce flanges, plus a number of additional reinforcements and special details.

Spruce and plywood ribs were connected with gusset joints. Some heavy-duty ribs contained pieces of ash and walnut, as well as the special five ply that included veneers laid up at 45°. The upper skin construction was in two layers of 0.25-in five-ply birch, separated by Douglas fir stringers running in the span-wise direction. The wings were covered with madapollam fabric and doped in a similar manner to the fuselage. The wing was installed into the roots by means of four large attachment points. The engine radiators were fitted in the inner wing, just outboard of the fuselage on either side. These gave less drag. The radiators themselves were split into three sections: an oil cooler section outboard, the middle section forming the coolant radiator and the inboard section serving the cabin heater.

The wing contained metal-framed and -skinned ailerons, but the flaps were made of wood and were hydraulically controlled. The nacelles were mostly wood, although for strength, the engine mounts were all metal, as were the undercarriage parts. Engine mounts of welded steel tube were added, along with simple landing gear oleos filled with rubber blocks. Wood was used to carry only in-plane loads, with metal fittings used for all triaxially loaded components such as landing gear, engine mounts, control-surface mounting brackets, and the wing-to-fuselage junction. The outer leading wing edge had to be brought  further forward to accommodate this design. The main tail unit was all wood built. The control surfaces, the rudder, and elevator were aluminium-framed and fabric-covered. The total weight of metal castings and forgings used in the aircraft was only .

In November 1944, several crashes occurred in the Far East. At first,  these were thought to be a result of wing-structure failures. The casein glue, it was said, cracked when exposed to extreme heat and/or monsoon conditions. This caused the upper surfaces to "lift" from the main spar. An investigating team led by Major Hereward de Havilland travelled to India and produced a report in early December 1944 stating, "the accidents were not caused by the deterioration of the glue, but by shrinkage of the airframe during the wet monsoon season". However, a later inquiry by Cabot & Myers firmly attributed the accidents to faulty manufacture and this was confirmed by a further investigation team by the Ministry of Aircraft Production at Defford, which found faults in six Mosquito marks (all built at de Havilland's Hatfield and Leavesden plants). The defects were similar, and none of the aircraft had been exposed to monsoon conditions or termite attack.

The investigators concluded that construction defects occurred at the two plants. They found that the "...standard of glueing ... left much to be desired." Records at the time showed that accidents caused by "loss of control" were three times more frequent on Mosquitoes than on any other type of aircraft. The Air Ministry forestalled any loss of confidence in the Mosquito by holding to Major de Havilland's initial investigation in India that the accidents were caused "largely by climate" To solve the problem of seepage into the interior, a strip of plywood was set along the span of the wing to seal the entire length of the skin joint.

Systems

The fuel systems gave the Mosquito good range and endurance, using up to nine fuel tanks. Two outer wing tanks each contained  of fuel. These were complemented by two inner wing fuel tanks, each containing , located between the wing root and engine nacelle. In the central fuselage were twin fuel tanks mounted between bulkhead number two and three aft of the cockpit. In the FB.VI, these tanks contained  each, while in the B.IV and other unarmed Mosquitoes each of the two centre tanks contained . In addition, the FB Mk.

The design of the Mk.VI allowed for a provisional long-range fuel tank to increase range for action over enemy territory, for the installation of bomb release equipment specific to depth charges for strikes against enemy shipping, or for the simultaneous use of rocket projectiles along with a  drop tank under each wing supplementing the main fuel cells.

To reduce fuel vaporisation at the high altitudes of photographic reconnaissance variants, the central and inner wing tanks were pressurised. The pressure venting cock located behind the pilot's seat controlled the pressure valve. As the altitude increased, the valve increased the volume applied by a pump. This system was extended to include field modifications of the fuel tank system.

The engine oil tanks were in the engine nacelles. Each nacelle contained a  oil tank, including a  air space. The oil tanks themselves had no separate coolant controlling systems. The coolant header tank was in the forward nacelle, behind the propeller. The remaining coolant systems were controlled by the coolant radiators shutters in the forward inner wing compartment, between the nacelle and the fuselage and behind the main engine cooling radiators, which were fitted in the leading edge. Electric-pneumatic operated radiator shutters directed and controlled airflow through the ducts and into the coolant valves, to predetermined temperatures.

Electrical power came from a 24 volt DC generator on the starboard (No. 2) engine and an alternator on the port engine, which also supplied AC power for radios. The radiator shutters, supercharger gear change, gun camera, bomb bay, bomb/rocket release and all the other crew controlled instruments were powered by a 24 V battery. The radio communication devices included VHF and HF communications, GEE navigation, and IFF and G.P. devices. The electric generators also powered the fire extinguishers. Located on the starboard side of the cockpit, the switches would operate automatically in the event of a crash. In flight, a warning light would flash to indicate a fire, should the pilot not already be aware of it. In later models, to save liquids and engine clean up time in case of belly landing, the fire extinguisher was changed to semi-automatic triggers.

The main landing gear, housed in the nacelles behind the engines, were raised and lowered hydraulically. The main landing gear shock absorbers were de Havilland manufactured and used a system of rubber in compression, rather than hydraulic oleos, with twin pneumatic brakes for each wheel. The Dunlop-Marstrand anti-shimmy tailwheel was also retractable.

Operational history

The de Havilland Mosquito operated in many roles, performing medium bomber, reconnaissance, tactical strike, anti-submarine warfare, shipping attacks and night fighter duties, until the end of the war. In July 1941, the first production Mosquito W4051 (a production fuselage combined with some prototype flying surfaces – see Prototypes and test flights) was sent to No. 1 Photographic Reconnaissance Unit (PRU), at RAF Benson. The secret reconnaissance flights of this aircraft were the first operational missions of the Mosquito. In 1944, the journal Flight  gave 19 September 1941 as date of the first PR mission, at an altitude "of some 20,000 ft".

On 15 November 1941, 105 Squadron, RAF, took delivery at RAF Swanton Morley, Norfolk, of the first operational Mosquito Mk. B.IV bomber, serial no. W4064. Throughout 1942, 105 Squadron, based next at RAF Horsham St. Faith, then from 29 September, RAF Marham, undertook daylight low-level and shallow dive attacks. Apart from the Oslo and Berlin raids, the strikes were mainly on industrial and infrastructure targets in occupied Netherlands and Norway, France and northern and western Germany. The crews faced deadly flak and fighters, particularly Focke-Wulf Fw 190s, which they called snappers. Germany still controlled continental airspace and the Fw 190s were often already airborne and at an advantageous altitude. Collisions within the formations also caused casualties. It was the Mosquito's excellent handling capabilities, rather than pure speed, that facilitated successful evasions.

The Mosquito was first announced publicly on 26 September 1942 after the Oslo Mosquito raid of 25 September. It was featured in The Times on 28 September and the next day the newspaper published two captioned photographs illustrating the bomb strikes and damage. On 6 December 1942, Mosquitoes from Nos. 105 and 139 Squadrons made up part of the bomber force used in Operation Oyster, the large No. 2 Group raid against the Philips works at Eindhoven.

From mid-1942 to mid-1943, Mosquito bombers flew high-speed, medium and low-altitude daylight missions against factories, railways and other pinpoint targets in Germany and German-occupied Europe. From June 1943, Mosquito bombers were formed into the Light Night Striking Force to guide RAF Bomber Command heavy bomber raids and as "nuisance" bombers, dropping Blockbuster bombs –  "cookies" – in high-altitude, high-speed raids that German night fighters were almost powerless to intercept.

As a night fighter from mid-1942, the Mosquito intercepted Luftwaffe raids on Britain, notably those of Operation Steinbock in 1944. Starting in July 1942, Mosquito night-fighter units raided Luftwaffe airfields. As part of 100 Group, it was flown as a night fighter and as an intruder supporting Bomber Command heavy bombers that reduced losses during 1944 and 1945.

The Mosquito fighter-bomber served as a strike aircraft in the Second Tactical Air Force (2TAF) from its inception on 1 June 1943. The main objective was to prepare for the invasion of occupied Europe a year later. In Operation Overlord three Mosquito FB Mk. VI wings flew close air support for the Allied armies in co-operation with other RAF units equipped with the North American B-25 Mitchell medium bomber. In the months between the foundation of 2TAF and its duties from D day onwards, vital training was interspersed with attacks on V-1 flying bomb launch sites.

In another example of the daylight precision raids carried out by the Mosquitoes of Nos. 105 and 139 Squadrons, on 30 January 1943, the 10th anniversary of the Nazis' seizure of power, a morning Mosquito attack knocked out the main Berlin broadcasting station while Luftwaffe Chief Reichsmarschall Hermann Göring was speaking, putting his speech off the air. A second sortie in the afternoon inconvenienced another speech, by Propaganda Minister Joseph Goebbels. Lecturing a group of German aircraft manufacturers, Göring said:

During this daylight-raiding phase, Nos. 105 and 139 Squadrons flew 139 combat operations and aircrew losses were high. Even the losses incurred in the squadrons' dangerous Blenheim era were exceeded in percentage terms. The Roll of Honour shows 51 aircrew deaths from the end of May 1942 to April 1943. In the corresponding period, crews gained three Mentions in Despatches, two DFMs and three DFCs. The low-level daylight attacks finished on 27 May 1943 with strikes on the Schott glass and Zeiss instrument works, both in Jena. Subsequently, when low-level precision attacks required Mosquitoes, they were allotted to squadrons operating the FB.IV version. Examples include the Aarhus air raid and Operation Jericho.

Since the beginning of the year, the German fighter force had become seriously overstretched. In April 1943, in response to "political humiliation" caused by the Mosquito, Göring ordered the formation of special Luftwaffe units (Jagdgeschwader 25, commanded by Oberstleutnant Herbert Ihlefeld and Jagdgeschwader 50, under Major Hermann Graf) to combat the Mosquito attacks, though these units, which were "little more than glorified squadrons", were unsuccessful against the elusive RAF aircraft. Post-war German histories also indicate that there was a belief within the Luftwaffe that Mosquito aircraft "gave only a weak radar signal.".

The first Mosquito Squadron to be equipped with Oboe (navigation) was No. 109, based at RAF Wyton, after working as an experimental unit at RAF Boscombe Down. They used Oboe in anger for the first time on 31 December 1942 and 1 January 1943, target marking for a force of heavy bombers attacking Düsseldorf.. On 1 June, the two pioneering Squadrons joined No. 109 Squadron in the re-formed No. 8 Group RAF (Bomber Command). Initially they were engaged in moderately high altitude (about ) night bombing, with 67 trips during that summer, mainly to Berlin. Soon after, Nos. 105 and 139 Squadron bombers were widely used by the RAF Pathfinder Force, marking targets for the main night-time strategic bombing force.

In what were, initially, diversionary "nuisance raids," Mosquito bombers dropped 4,000 lb Blockbuster bombs or "Cookies." Particularly after the introduction of H2S (radar) in some Mosquitoes, these raids carrying larger bombs succeeded to the extent that they provided a significant additional form of attack to the large formations of "heavies." Latterly in the war, there were a significant number of all-Mosquito raids on big German cities involving up to 100 or more aircraft. On the night of 20/21 February 1945, for example, Mosquitoes of No. 8 Group mounted the first of 36 consecutive night raids on Berlin.

From 1943, Mosquitoes with RAF Coastal Command attacked Kriegsmarine U-boats and intercepted transport ship concentrations. After Operation Overlord, the U-boat threat in the Western Approaches decreased fairly quickly, but correspondingly the Norwegian and Danish waters posed greater dangers. Hence the RAF Coastal Command Mosquitoes were moved to Scotland to counter this threat. The Strike Wing at Banff stood up in September 1944 and comprised Mosquito aircraft of No's 143, 144, 235 and 248 Squadrons Royal Air Force and No.333 Squadron Royal Norwegian Air Force. Despite an initially high loss rate, the Mosquito bomber variants ended the war with the lowest losses of any aircraft in RAF Bomber Command service.

The Mosquito also proved a very capable night fighter. Some of the most successful RAF pilots flew these variants. For example, Wing Commander Branse Burbridge claimed 21 kills.

Mosquitoes of No. 100 Group RAF acted as night intruders operating at high level in support of the Bomber Command "heavies", to counter the enemy tactic of merging into the bomber stream, which, towards the end of 1943, was causing serious allied losses. These RCM (radio countermeasures) aircraft were fitted with a device called "Serrate" to allow them to track down German night fighters from their Lichtenstein B/C (low-UHF-band) and Lichtenstein SN-2 (lower end of the VHF FM broadcast band) radar emissions, as well as a device named "Perfectos" that tracked German IFF signals. These methods were responsible for the destruction of 257 German aircraft from December 1943 to April 1945. Mosquito fighters from all units accounted for 487 German aircraft during the war, the vast majority of which were night fighters.

One Mosquito is listed as belonging to German secret operations unit Kampfgeschwader 200, which tested, evaluated and sometimes clandestinely operated captured enemy aircraft during the war. The aircraft was listed on the order of battle of Versuchsverband OKLs, 2 Staffel, Stab Gruppe on 10 November and 31 December 1944. However, on both lists, the Mosquito is listed as unserviceable.

The Mosquito flew its last official European war mission on 21 May 1945, when Mosquitoes of 143 Squadron and 248 Squadron RAF were ordered to continue to hunt German submarines that might be tempted to continue the fight; instead of submarines all the Mosquitoes encountered were passive E-boats.

The last operational RAF Mosquitoes were the Mosquito TT.35's, which were finally retired from No. 3 Civilian Anti-Aircraft Co-Operation Unit (CAACU) in May 1963.

In 1947–49, up to 180 Canadian surplus Mosquitoes flew many operations for the Nationalist Chinese under Chiang Kai-shek in the civil war against Communist forces. Pilots from three squadrons of Mosquitoes claimed to have sunk or damaged 500 ships during one invasion attempt. As the Communists assumed control, the remaining aircraft were evacuated to Formosa, where they flew missions against shipping.

Variants
Until the end of 1942 the RAF always used Roman numerals (I, II, ...) for mark numbers; 1943–1948 was a transition period during which new aircraft entering service were given Arabic numerals (1, 2, ...) for mark numbers, but older aircraft retained their Roman numerals. From 1948 onwards, Arabic numerals were used exclusively.

Prototypes
Three prototypes were built, each with a different configuration. The first to fly was W4050 on 25 November 1940, followed by the fighter W4052 on 15 May 1941 and the photo-reconnaissance prototype W4051 on 10 June 1941. W4051 later flew operationally with 1 Photographic Reconnaissance Unit (1 PRU).

Photo-reconnaissance

A total of 10 Mosquito PR Mk.Is were built, four of them "long range" versions equipped with a  overload fuel tank in the fuselage. The contract called for 10 of the PR Mk.I airframes to be converted to B Mk.IV Series 1s. All of the PR Mk.Is, and the B Mk.IV Series 1s, had the original short engine nacelles and short span (19 ft 5.5 in) tailplanes. Their engine cowlings incorporated the original pattern of integrated exhaust manifolds, which, after relatively brief flight time, had a troublesome habit of burning and blistering the cowling panels.

Over 30 Mosquito B Mk.IV bombers were converted into the PR Mk.IV photo-reconnaissance aircraft. The first operational flight by a PR Mk.IV was made by DK284 in April 1942.

The Mosquito PR Mk.VIII, built as a stopgap pending the introduction of the refined PR Mk.IX, was the next photo-reconnaissance version. The five VIIIs were converted from B Mk.IVs and became the first operational Mosquito version to be powered by two-stage, two-speed supercharged engines, using  Rolls-Royce Merlin 61 engines in place of Merlin 21/22s. The first PR Mk.VIII, DK324 first flew on 20 October 1942.

The Mosquito PR Mk.IX, 90 of which were built, was the first Mosquito variant with two-stage, two-speed engines to be produced in quantity; the first of these, LR405, first flew in April 1943. The PR Mk.IX was based on the Mosquito B Mk.IX bomber and was powered by two  Merlin 72/73 or 76/77 engines. It could carry either two , two  or two  droppable fuel tanks.

The Mosquito PR Mk.XVI had a pressurised cockpit and, like the Mk.IX, was powered by two Rolls-Royce Merlin 72/73 or 76/77 piston engines. This version was equipped with three overload fuel tanks, totalling  in the bomb bay, and could also carry two  or  drop tanks. A total of 435 of the PR Mk.XVI were built.

The Mosquito PR Mk.32 was a long-range, high-altitude, pressurised photo-reconnaissance version. It was powered by a pair of two-stage supercharged  Rolls-Royce Merlin 113 and Merlin 114 piston engines, the Merlin 113 on the starboard side and the Merlin 114 on the port. First flown in August 1944, only five were built and all were conversions from PR.XVIs.

The Mosquito PR Mk.34 and PR Mk.34A was a very long-range unarmed high altitude photo-reconnaissance version. The fuel tank and cockpit protection armour were removed. Powered by two  Merlin 114s first used in the PR.32. The port Merlin 114 drove a Marshal cabin supercharger. A total of 181 were built, including 50 built by Percival Aircraft Company at Luton.
All PR.34s were installed with four split F52 vertical cameras, two forward, two aft of the fuselage tank and one F24 oblique camera. Sometimes a K-17 camera was used for air surveys. In August 1945, the PR.34A was the final photo-reconnaissance variant with one Merlin 113A and 114A each delivering .

Colonel Roy M. Stanley II, USAF (RET) wrote: "I consider the Mosquito the best photo-reconnaissance aircraft of the war".

After the end of World War II Spartan Air Services used ten ex-RAF Mosquitoes, mostly B.35s plus one of only six PR.35s built, for high-altitude photographic survey work in Canada.

Bombers

On 21 June 1941 the Air Ministry ordered that the last 10 Mosquitoes, ordered as photo-reconnaissance aircraft, should be converted to bombers. These 10 aircraft were part of the original 1 March 1940 production order and became the B Mk.IV Series 1. W4052 was to be the prototype and flew for the first time on 8 September 1941.

The bomber prototype led to the B Mk.IV, of which 273 were built: apart from the 10 Series 1s, all of the rest were built as Series 2s with extended nacelles, revised exhaust manifolds, with integrated flame dampers, and larger tailplanes. Series 2 bombers also differed from the Series 1 in having an increased payload of four  bombs, instead of the four  bombs of Series 1. This was made possible by cropping, or shortening the tail of the  bomb so that these four heavier weapons could be carried (or a 2,000 lb (920 kg) total load). The B Mk.IV entered service in May 1942 with 105 Squadron.

In April 1943 it was decided to convert a B Mk.IV to carry a  Blockbuster bomb (nicknamed a Cookie). The conversion, including modified bomb bay suspension arrangements, bulged bomb bay doors and fairings, was relatively straightforward and 54 B.IVs were modified and distributed to squadrons of the Light Night Striking Force. 27 B Mk.IVs were later converted for special operations with the Highball anti-shipping weapon, and were used by 618 Squadron, formed in April 1943 specifically to use this weapon. A B Mk.IV, DK290 was initially used as a trials aircraft for the bomb, followed by DZ471,530 and 533.

Other bomber variants of the Mosquito included the Merlin 21 powered B Mk.V high-altitude version. Trials with this configuration were made with W4057, which had strengthened wings and two additional fuel tanks, or alternatively, two  bombs. This design was not produced in Britain, but formed the basic design of the Canadian-built B.VII. Only W4057 was built in prototype form. The Merlin 31 powered B Mk.VII was built by de Havilland Canada and first flown on 24 September 1942. It only saw service in Canada, 25 were built. Six were handed over to the United States Army Air Forces.

B Mk.IX (54 built) was powered by the Merlin 72,73, 76 or 77. The two-stage Merlin variant was based on the PR.IX. The prototype DK 324 was converted from a PR.VIII and first flew on 24 March 1943. In October 1943 it was decided that all B Mk.IVs and all B Mk.IXs then in service would be converted to carry the  "Cookie", and all B Mk.IXs built after that date were designed to allow them to be converted to carry the weapon. A Mosquito B Mk.IX holds the record for the most combat operations flown by an Allied bomber in the Second World War. LR503, known as "F for Freddie" (from its squadron code letters, GB*F), first served with No. 109 and subsequently, No. 105 RAF squadrons. It flew 213 sorties during the war, only to crash at Calgary airport during the Eighth Victory Loan Bond Drive on 10 May 1945, two days after Victory in Europe Day, killing both the pilot, Flt. Lt. Maurice Briggs, DSO, DFC, DFM and navigator Fl. Off. John Baker, DFC and Bar.

The B Mk.XVI was powered by the same variations as the B.IX. All B Mk.XVIs were capable of being converted to carry the  "Cookie". The two-stage powerplants were added along with a pressurised cabin. DZ540 first flew on 1 January 1944. The prototype was converted from a IV (402 built). The next variant, the B Mk.XX, was powered by Packard Merlins 31 and 33s. It was the Canadian version of the IV. Altogether, 245 were built. The type could carry  of bombs.

The B.35 was powered by Merlin 113 and 114As. Some were converted to TT.35s (Target Tugs) and others were used as PR.35s (photo-reconnaissance). A total of 174 B.35s were delivered up to the end of 1945. A further 100 were delivered from 1946 for a grand total of 274, 65 of which were built by Airspeed Ltd.

Fighters

Developed during 1940, the first prototype of the Mosquito F Mk.II was completed on 15 May 1941. These Mosquitoes were fitted with four  Hispano cannon in the fuselage belly and four .303 (7.7 mm) Browning machine guns mounted in the nose. On production Mk.IIs the machine guns and ammunition tanks were accessed via two centrally hinged, sideways opening doors in the upper nose section. To arm and service the cannon the bomb bay doors were replaced by manually operated bay doors: the F and NF Mk.IIs could not carry bombs. The type was also fitted with a gun camera in a compartment above the machine guns in the nose and was fitted with exhaust flame dampers to reduce the glare from the Merlin XXs.

In the summer of 1942, Britain experienced day-time incursions of the high-altitude reconnaissance bomber, the Junkers Ju 86P. Although the Ju 86P only carried a light bomb load, it overflew sensitive areas, including Bristol, Bedfordshire and Hertfordshire. Bombs were dropped on Luton and elsewhere, and this particular aircraft was seen from the main de Havilland offices and factory at Hatfield. An attempt to intercept it with a Spitfire from RAF Manston was unsuccessful. As a result of the potential threat, a decision was quickly taken to develop a high-altitude Mosquito interceptor, using the MP469 prototype.

MP469 entered the experimental shop on 7 September and made its initial flight on 14 September, piloted by John de Havilland. The bomber nose was altered using a normal fighter nose, armed with four standard .303 (7.7 mm) Browning machine guns. The low pressure cabin retained a bomber canopy structure and a two-piece windscreen. The control wheel was replaced with a fighter control stick. The airframe was lightened by removing armour plating, some fuel tanks and other fitments. Smaller-diameter main wheels were fitted after the first few flights. At a loaded weight of  this HA Mk.XV was  lighter than a standard Mk.II. For this first conversion, the engines were a pair of Merlin 61s. The aircraft was delivered to a High Altitude Flight which had been formed at RAF Northolt. However, the high-level German daylight intruders were no longer to be seen. It was subsequently revealed that only five Ju 86P aircraft had been built and they had only flown 12 sorties. Nevertheless, the general need for high altitude interceptors was recognised – but now the emphasis was to be upon night fighters.

The A&AEE tested the climb and speed of night fighter conversion of MP469 in January 1943 for the Ministry of Aircraft Production. According to Birtles, an AI radar was mounted in the nose and the Merlins were upgraded to Mk76 type, although Boscombe Down reported Merlin 61s. In addition to MP469, four more B Mk.IVs were converted into NF MK XVs. The Fighter Interception Unit at RAF Ford carried out service trials, March 1943, and then these five aircraft went to 85 Squadron, Hunsdon, where they were flown from April until August of that year.

Apart from the F Mk.XV, all Mosquito fighters and fighter bombers featured a modified canopy structure incorporating a flat, single piece armoured windscreen, and the crew entry/exit door was moved from the bottom of the forward fuselage to the right side of the nose, just forward of the wing leading edge.

Night fighters

At the end of 1940, the Air Staff's preferred turret-equipped night fighter design to Operational Requirement O.R. 95 was the Gloster F.18/40 (derived from their F.9/37). However, although in agreement as to the quality of the Gloster company's design, the Ministry of Aircraft Production was concerned that Gloster would not be able to work on the F.18/40 and also the jet fighter design, considered the greater priority. Consequently, in mid-1941 the Air Staff and MAP agreed that the Gloster aircraft would be dropped and the Mosquito, when fitted with a turret would be considered for the night fighter requirement.

The first production night fighter Mosquitoes – minus turrets – were designated NF Mk.II. A total of 466 were built with the first entering service with No. 157 Squadron in January 1942, replacing the Douglas Havoc. These aircraft were similar to the F Mk.II, but were fitted with the AI Mk.IV metric wavelength radar. The herring-bone transmitting antenna was mounted on the nose and the dipole receiving antennae were carried under the outer wings. A number of NF IIs had their radar equipment removed and additional fuel tanks installed in the bay behind the cannon for use as night intruders. These aircraft, designated NF II (Special) were first used by 23 Squadron in operations over Europe in 1942. 23 Squadron was then deployed to Malta on 20 December 1942, and operated against targets in Italy.

Ninety-seven NF Mk.IIs were upgraded with 3.3 GHz frequency, low-SHF-band AI Mk.VIII radar and these were designated NF Mk.XII. The NF Mk.XIII, of which 270 were built, was the production equivalent of the Mk.XII conversions. These "centimetric" radar sets were mounted in a solid "thimble" (Mk.XII / XIII) or universal "bull nose" (Mk.XVII / XIX) radome, which required the machine guns to be dispensed with.

Four F Mk.XVs were converted to the NF Mk.XV. These were fitted with AI Mk.VIII in a "thimble" radome, and the .303 Brownings were moved into a gun pack fitted under the forward fuselage.

 NF Mk.XVII was the designation for 99 NF Mk.II conversions, with single-stage Merlin 21, 22, or 23 engines, but British AI.X (US SCR-720) radar.

The NF Mk.XIX was an improved version of the NF XIII. It could be fitted with American or British AI radars; 220 were built.

The NF Mk.30 was the final wartime variant and was a high-altitude version, powered by two  Rolls-Royce Merlin 76s. It also carried early electronic countermeasures equipment. 526 were built.

Other Mosquito night fighter variants planned but never built included the NF Mk.X and NF Mk.XIV (the latter based on the NF Mk.XIII), both of which were to have two-stage Merlins. The NF Mk.31 was a variant of the NF Mk.30, but powered by Packard Merlins.

After the war, two more night fighter versions were developed:
The NF Mk.36 was similar to the Mosquito NF Mk.30, but fitted with the American-built AI.Mk.X radar. Powered by two  Rolls-Royce Merlin 113/114 piston engines; 266 built.

The NF Mk.38, 101 of which were built, was also similar to the Mosquito NF Mk.30, but fitted with the British-built AI Mk.IX radar. This variant suffered from stability problems and did not enter RAF service: 60 were eventually sold to Yugoslavia. However, from 10,000 to  the maximum speed was 348 knots (400 mph). Little difference was noted above .

Strike ("fighter-bomber") variants 

The FB Mk. VI, which first flew on 1 June 1942, was powered by two, single-stage two-speed,  Merlin 21s or  Merlin 25s, and introduced a re-stressed and reinforced "basic" wing structure capable of carrying single  bombs on racks housed in streamlined fairings under each wing, or up to eight RP-3 25lb or 60 lb rockets. In addition fuel lines were added to the wings to enable single  or  drop tanks to be carried under each wing. The usual fixed armament was four 20 mm Hispano Mk.II cannon and four .303 (7.7 mm) Browning machine guns, while two  bombs could be carried in the bomb bay.

Unlike the F Mk.II, the ventral bay doors were split into two pairs, with the forward pair being used to access the cannon, while the rear pair acted as bomb bay doors. The maximum fuel load was  distributed between  internal fuel tanks, plus two overload tanks, each of  capacity, which could be fitted in the bomb bay, and two  drop tanks. The test aircraft (HJ679) fitted with stub exhausts was found to be performing below expectations. It was returned to de Havilland at Hatfield where it was serviced. Its top speed was then tested and found to be , in line with expectations. 2,298 FB Mk. VIs were built, nearly one-third of Mosquito production. Two were converted to TR.33 carrier-borne, maritime strike prototypes.

The FB Mk. VI proved capable of holding its own against fighter aircraft, in addition to strike/bombing roles. For example, on 15 January 1945 Mosquito FB Mk. VIs of 143 Squadron were engaged by 30 Focke-Wulf Fw 190s from Jagdgeschwader 5: the Mosquitoes sank an armed trawler and two merchant ships, but five Mosquitoes were lost (two reportedly to flak), while shooting down five Fw 190s.

Another fighter-bomber variant was the Mosquito FB Mk. XVIII (sometimes known as the Tsetse) of which one was converted from a FB Mk. VI to serve as prototype and 17 were purpose-built. The Mk.XVIII was armed with a Molins "6-pounder Class M" cannon: this was a modified QF 6-pounder (57 mm) anti-tank gun fitted with an auto-loader to allow both semi- or fully automatic fire. 25 rounds were carried, with the entire installation weighing . In addition,  of armour was added within the engine cowlings, around the nose and under the cockpit floor to protect the engines and crew from heavily armed U-boats, the intended primary target of the Mk.XVIII. Two or four .303 (7.7 mm) Browning machine guns were retained in the nose and were used to "sight" the main weapon onto the target.

The Air Ministry initially suspected that this variant would not work, but tests proved otherwise. Although the gun provided the Mosquito with yet more anti-shipping firepower for use against U-boats, it required a steady approach run to aim and fire the gun, making its wooden construction an even greater liability, in the face of intense anti-aircraft fire. A move during the dive could jam the gun. The prototype HJ732 was converted from a FB.VI and was first flown on 8 June 1943.

The effect of the new weapon was demonstrated on 10 March 1944 when Mk.XVIIIs from 248 Squadron (escorted by four Mk.VIs) engaged a German convoy of one U-boat and four destroyers, protected by 10 Ju 88s. Three of the Ju 88s were shot down. Pilot Tony Phillips destroyed one Ju 88 with four shells, one of which tore an engine off the Ju 88. The U-boat was damaged. On 25 March,  was sunk by Molins-equipped Mosquitoes. On 10 June,  was abandoned in the face of intense air attack from No. 248 Squadron, and was later sunk by a Liberator of No. 206 Squadron. On 5 April 1945 Mosquitoes with Molins attacked five German surface ships in the Kattegat and again demonstrated their value by setting them all on fire and sinking them. A German Sperrbrecher ("minefield breaker") was lost with all hands, with some 200 bodies being recovered by Swedish vessels. Some 900 German soldiers died in total. All were sunk with rockets.  and  followed on 19 April and 2 May 1945, also sunk by rockets.

Despite the preference for rockets, a further development of the large gun idea was carried out using the even larger, 96 mm calibre QF 32-pounder, a gun based on the QF 3.7-inch AA gun designed for tank use, the airborne version using a novel form of muzzle brake. Developed to prove the feasibility of using such a large weapon in the Mosquito, this installation was not completed until after the war, when it was flown and fired in a single aircraft without problems, then scrapped.

Designs based on the Mk.VI were the FB Mk. 26, built in Canada, and the FB Mk.40, built in Australia, powered by Packard Merlins. The FB.26 improved from the FB.21 using  single stage Packard Merlin 225s. Some 300 were built and another 37 converted to T.29 standard. 212 FB.40s were built by de Havilland Australia. Six were converted to PR.40; 28 to PR.41s, one to FB.42 and 22 to T.43 trainers. Most were powered by Packard-built Merlin 31 or 33s.

Trainers
The Mosquito was also built as the Mosquito T Mk.III two-seat trainer. This version, powered by two Rolls-Royce Merlin 21s, was unarmed and had a modified cockpit fitted with dual control arrangements. A total of 348 of the T Mk.III were built for the RAF and Fleet Air Arm. de Havilland Australia built 11 T Mk.43 trainers, similar to the Mk.III.

Torpedo-bombers
To meet specification N.15/44 for a navalised Mosquito for Royal Navy use as a torpedo bomber, de Havilland produced a carrier-borne variant. A Mosquito FB.VI was modified as a prototype designated Sea Mosquito TR Mk.33 with folding wings, arrester hook, thimble nose radome, Merlin 25 engines with four-bladed propellers and a new oleo-pneumatic landing gear rather than the standard rubber-in-compression gear. Initial carrier tests of the Sea Mosquito were carried out by Eric "Winkle" Brown aboard HMS Indefatigable, the first landing-on taking place on 25 March 1944. An order for 100 TR.33s was placed although only 50 were built at Leavesden. Armament was four 20 mm cannon, two 500 lb bombs in the bomb bay (another two could be fitted under the wings), eight 60 lb rockets (four under each wing) and a standard torpedo under the fuselage. The first production TR.33 flew on 10 November 1945. This series was followed by six Sea Mosquito TR Mk.37s, which differed in having ASV Mk.XIII radar instead of the TR.33's AN/APS-6.

Target tugs

The RAF's target tug version was the Mosquito TT Mk.35, which were the last aircraft to remain in operational service with No 3 CAACU at Exeter, being finally retired in 1963. These aircraft were then featured in the film 633 Squadron.
A number of B Mk.XVIs bombers were converted into TT Mk.39 target tug aircraft. The Royal Navy also operated the Mosquito TT Mk.39 for target towing.
Two ex-RAF FB.6s were converted to TT.6 standard at Manchester (Ringway) Airport by Fairey Aviation in 1953–1954, and delivered to the Belgian Air Force for use as towing aircraft from the Sylt firing ranges.

Canadian-built

A total of 1,032 (wartime 
+ 2 afterwards) Mosquitoes were built by De Havilland Canada at Downsview Airfield in Downsview Ontario (now Downsview Park in Toronto Ontario).
 Mosquito B Mk.VII : Canadian version based on the Mosquito B Mk.V bomber aircraft. Powered by two  Packard Merlin 31 piston engines; 25 built.
 Mosquito B Mk.XX : Canadian version of the Mosquito B Mk.IV bomber aircraft; 145 built, of which 40 were converted into F-8 photo-reconnaissance aircraft for the USAAF.
 Mosquito FB Mk.21 : Canadian version of the Mosquito FB Mk. VI fighter-bomber aircraft. Powered by two  Rolls-Royce Merlin 31 piston engines, three built.
 Mosquito T Mk.22 : Canadian version of the Mosquito T Mk.III training aircraft.
 Mosquito B Mk.23 : Unused designation for a bomber variant.
 Mosquito FB Mk.24 : Canadian fighter-bomber version. Powered by two  Rolls-Royce Merlin 301 piston engines; two built.
 Mosquito B Mk.25 : Improved version of the Mosquito B Mk.XX Bomber aircraft. Powered by two  Packard Merlin 225 piston engines; 400 built.
 Mosquito FB Mk.26 : Improved version of the Mosquito FB Mk.21 fighter-bomber aircraft. Powered by two  Packard Merlin 225 piston engines; 338 built.
 Mosquito T Mk.27 : Canadian-built training aircraft.
 Mosquito T Mk.29 : A number of FB Mk.26 fighters were converted into T Mk.29 trainers.

Australian-built

 Mosquito FB Mk.40 : Two-seat fighter-bomber version for the RAAF. Powered by two  Rolls-Royce Merlin 31 piston engines. A total of 178 built in Australia.
 Mosquito PR Mk.40 : This designation was given to six FB Mk.40s, which were converted into photo-reconnaissance aircraft.
 Mosquito FB Mk.41 : Two-seat fighter-bomber version for the RAAF. A total of 11 were built in Australia.
 Mosquito PR Mk.41 : Two-seat photo-survey version for the RAAF. A total of 17 were built in Australia.
 Mosquito FB Mk.42 : Two-seat fighter-bomber version. Powered by two Rolls-Royce Merlin 69 piston engines. One FB Mk.40 aircraft was converted into a Mosquito FB Mk.42.
 Mosquito T Mk.43 : Two-seat training version for the RAAF. A total of 11 FB Mk.40s were converted into Mosquito T Mk.43s.

Highball
A number of Mosquito IVs were modified by Vickers-Armstrongs to carry Highball "bouncing bombs" and were allocated Vickers Type numbers:
 Type 463 – Prototype Highball conversion of Mosquito IV DZ741.
 Type 465 – Conversion of 33 Mosquito IVs to carry Highball.

Production

About 5,000 of the total of 7,781 Mosquitoes built had major structural components fabricated from wood in High Wycombe, Buckinghamshire, England. Fuselages, wings and tailplanes were made at furniture companies such as Ronson, E. Gomme, Parker Knoll, Austinsuite and Styles & Mealing. Wing spars were made by J. B. Heath and Dancer & Hearne. Many of the other parts, including flaps, flap shrouds, fins, leading edge assemblies and bomb doors were also produced in the Buckinghamshire town. Dancer & Hearne processed much of the wood from start to finish, receiving timber and transforming it into finished wing spars at their factory in Penn Street on the outskirts of High Wycombe.

Initially much of the specialised yellow birch wood veneer and finished plywood used for the prototypes and early production aircraft was shipped from firms in Wisconsin, US. Prominent in this role were Roddis Plywood and Veneer Manufacturing in Marshfield. In conjunction with the USDA Forest Products Laboratory, Hamilton Roddis had developed new plywood adhesives and hot pressing technology.  Later on, paper birch was logged in large quantities from the interior of British Columbia along the Fraser and Quesnel Rivers and processed in Quesnel and New Westminster by the Pacific Veneer Company. According to the Quesnel archives, BC paper birch supplied ½ of the wartime British Empire birch used for Mosquitoes and other aircraft.

As the supply of Ecuadorean balsa was threatened by the U-boats in the Atlantic Ocean, the Ministry of Aircraft Production approved a research effort to supplant the balsa with calcium alginate foam, made from local brown algae. By 1944 the foam was ready, but the U-boat threat had been reduced, the larger B-25 bombers were in sufficient supply to handle most of the bombing raids, and the foam was not used in Mosquito production.

Canada

In July 1941, it was decided that DH Canada would build Mosquitoes at Downsview, Ontario. This was to continue even if Germany invaded Great Britain. Packard Merlin engines produced under licence were bench-tested by August and the first two aircraft were built in September. Production was to increase to fifty per month by early 1942. Initially, the Canadian production was for bomber variants; later, fighters, fighter-bombers and training aircraft were also made. DH Chief Production Engineer, Harry Povey, was sent first, then W. D. Hunter followed on an extended stay, to liaise with materials and parts suppliers. As was the case with initial UK production, Tego-bonded plywood and birch veneer was obtained from firms in Wisconsin, principally Roddis Plywood and Veneer Manufacturing, Marshfield. Enemy action delayed the shipping of jigs and moulds and it was decided to build these locally. During 1942, production improved to over 80 machines per month, as sub-contractors and suppliers became established. A mechanised production line based in part on car building methods started in 1944. As the war progressed, Canadian Mosquitoes may have utilized paper birch supplied by the Pacific Veneer Company of New Westminster using birch logs from the Cariboo, although records only say this birch was shipped to England for production there. When flight testing could no longer keep up, this was moved to the Central Aircraft Company airfield, London, Ontario, where the approved Mosquitoes left for commissioning and subsequent ferry transfer to Europe.

Ferrying Mosquitoes and many other types of WWII aircraft from Canada to Europe was dangerous, resulting in losses of lives and machines, but in the exigencies of war it was regarded as the best option for twin-engine and multi-engine aircraft. In the parlance of the day, among RAF personnel, "it was no piece of cake." Considerable efforts were made by de Havilland Canada to resolve problems with engine and oil systems and an additional five hours of flight testing were introduced before the ferry flight, but the actual cause of some of the losses was unknown. Nevertheless, by the end of the war, nearly 500 Mosquito bombers and fighter-bombers had been ferried successfully by the Canadian operation.

After DH Canada had been established for the Mosquito, further manufacturing was set up at DH Australia, in Sydney. One of the DH staff who travelled there was the distinguished test pilot, Pat Fillingham. These production lines added totals of 1,133 aircraft of varying types from Canada plus 212 aircraft from Australia.

Exports
In total, both during the war and after, de Havilland exported 46 FB.VIs and 29 PR. XVIs to Australia; two FB.VI and 18 NF.30s to Belgium; approximately 250 FB.26, T.29 and T.27s from Canada to Nationalist China. A significant number never went into service due to deterioration on the voyage and to crashes during Chinese pilot training; however, five were captured by the People's Liberation Army during the Chinese Civil War; 19 FB.VIs to Czechoslovakia in 1948; 6 FB.VIs to Dominica; a few B.IVs, 57 FB.VIs, 29 PR.XVIs and 23 NF.30s to France. Some T.IIIs were exported to Israel along with 60 FB.VIs, and at least five PR.XVIs and 14 naval versions. Four T.IIIs, 76 FB.VIs, one FB.40 and four T.43s were exported to New Zealand. Three T.IIIs were exported to Norway, and 18 FB.VIs, which were later converted to night fighter standard. South Africa received two F.II and 14 PR.XVI/XIs and Sweden received 60 NF.XIXs. Turkey received 96 FB.VIs and several T.IIIs, and Yugoslavia had 60 NF.38s, 80 FB.VIs and three T.IIIs delivered. At least a single de Havilland Mosquito was delivered to the Soviet Union marked 'DK 296'.

Sites
Total Mosquito production was 7,781, of which 6,710 were built during the war.

Civilian accidents and incidents
A number of Mosquitoes were lost in civilian airline service, mostly with British Overseas Airways Corporation during World War II.
 On 17 August 1943, G-AGGF crashed near Glenshee, Perthshire.
 On 25 October 1943, G-AGGG crashed near RAF Leuchars.
 On 3 January 1944, G-AGGD stalled on landing at Såtenäs, Sweden, and was written off.
 On 19 August 1944, G-AGKP crashed into the North Sea off Leuchars, Fife. All three people on board were killed.
 On 29 August 1944, G-AGKR disappeared on a flight from Gothenburg, Sweden, to RAF Leuchars with the loss of both crew members.

On 21 July 1996, Mosquito G-ASKH, wearing the markings of RR299, crashed 1 mile west of Manchester Barton Airport. Pilot Kevin Moorhouse and Engineer Steve Watson were both killed in the crash. At the time, this was the last airworthy Mosquito T.III.

Operators

Surviving aircraft 

There are approximately 30 non-flying Mosquitoes around the world with four airworthy examples, three in the United States and one in Canada. The largest collection of Mosquitoes is at the de Havilland Aircraft Museum in the United Kingdom, which owns three aircraft, including the first prototype, W4050, the only initial prototype of a Second World War British aircraft design still in existence in the 21st century.

Specifications (B Mk.XVI)

Notable appearances in media

See also

Notes

References

Citations

Sources 
 Air Ministry. Pilot's Notes For Mosquito B IV. London: 1943. A.P.2019D-PN.
 Air Ministry. Pilot's Notes For Mosquito, Marks VIII and IX, Mk.XVI. London: 1944. A.P.2653A, B, F, H & J-PN.
 Air Ministry. Pilot's Notes For Mosquito FB 6. London: 1945. .
 Air Ministry. Pilot's Notes For Mosquito NF 38. London: 1945. .
 Batchelor, John and Malcolm Low. de Havilland Mosquito Manual (Plane Essentials). Victoria, Australia: Publishing Solutions, 2008. .
 Bird, Andrew. A Separate Little War. London, UK: Grub Street, 2003. .
 Birtles, Philip. De Havilland Mosquito: The Original Multirole Combat Aircraft. Stroud, England: Fonthill Media, 2017. .
 Bishop, Edward. The Wooden Wonder. Shrewsbury, UK: Airlife Publishing Ltd., 3rd edition 1995. .
 Boiten, Theo. Nachtjagd: The Night Fighter Versus Bomber War over the Third Reich, 1939–45. London: Crowood Press, 1997. 
 Boog, Horst, Gerhard Krebs and Detlef Vogel. Germany and the Second World War: Volume VII: The Strategic Air War in Europe and the War in the West and East Asia, 1943-1944/5. Oxford, UK: Clarendon Press, 2006. .
 Bowman, Martin. de Havilland Mosquito (Crowood Aviation series). Ramsbury, Marlborough, Wiltshire, UK: The Crowood Press, 2005. .
 Bowman, Martin. Mosquito Bomber/Fighter-bomber Units 1942–45. Oxford, UK: Osprey Publishing, 1997. .
 Bowman, Martin. Mosquito Fighter/Fighter-bomber Units of World War 2. Oxford, UK: Osprey Publishing, 1998. .
 Bowman, Martin. Mosquito Photo-Reconnaissance Units of World War 2. Oxford, UK: Osprey Publishing, 1999. .
 Bowyer, Chaz. Mosquito at War. Shepperton, Surrey, UK: Ian Allan Ltd., 4th impression 1979. .
 Bowyer, Michael J.F., Bryan Philpott and Stuart Howe. Mosquito (Classic Aircraft No. 7: Their History and How to Model Them). Cambridge, UK: Patrick Stephens Ltd., 1980. .
 Bridgman, Leonard, ed. "The D.H.98 Mosquito." Jane's Fighting Aircraft of World War II. London: Studio, 1946. .
 Buttler, Tony. British Secret Projects: Fighters & Bombers 1935–1950. Hinckley, UK: Midland Publishing, 2004. .
 Caldwell, Donald L. and Richard Muller. The Luftwaffe Over Germany: Defense of the Reich . London: Greenhill MBI Publishing Company, 2007.  
 Cole, Roger. High Wycombe – Local History Series. Stroud, Gloucestershire, UK: Tempus Publishing Ltd., 2001. .
 Connor, Sara Witter, Hamilton Roddis Memorial Lecture Series No. 11. Wisconsin Flying Trees: Wisconsin Plywood Industry's Contribution to WWII. Department of Forest & Wildlife Ecology, Kemp Natural Resources Station, College of Agricultural and Life Sciences, University of Wisconsin – Madison 31 January 2007. Wayback Machine.
 Christie, Carl A. Ocean Bridge – The history of RAF Ferry Command Midland Publishing, Leicester, England, 1995. .
 Harris, Sir Arthur T. et al. Despatch on War Operations – 23rd. February 1942 to 8th. May 1945. Frank Cass, England, 1993. .
 Hotson, Fred. The De Havilland Canada Story. Toronto: CANAV Books, 1983. .
 Malayney, Norman, The 25th Bomb Group (Rcn) History in WWII, Schiffer Publishers Ltd. 2011..
 Miracle, Daniel B. and Steven L. Donaldson. ASM Handbook: Composites. Cleveland, Ohio: ASM International, 2001. .
 Mujumdar, A. S. Drying '92: Proceedings of the 8th International Drying Symposium. Toronto: Elsevier, 1992. .
 Rhodes, Tom. Stress Without Tears. Jacobs Publishing, 1st edition 1 December 2008. .
 Scott, Stuart R. "Mosquito Thunder: No. 105 Squadron RAF at war 1942-5." Sutton Publishing, Stroud, Gloucestershire, UK, 1999. .
 Scutts, Jerry. Mosquito in Action, Part 2. Carrollton, Texas: Squadron/Signal Publications Inc., 1993. .
 Sharp, C. Martin and Michael J.F. Bowyer. Mosquito. London: Faber & Faber, 1971. .
 Sharp, C. Martin and Michael J.F. Bowyer. Mosquito (2nd ed.). Manchester, UK: Crécy Books Ltd, 1995. .
 Simons, Graham M. Mosquito: The Original Multi-Role Combat Aircraft. Barnsley, Yorkshire, UK: Pen & Sword, 2011. 
 Streetly, Martin. "The Aircraft of 100 Group: Part 14. DH Mosquito, Internal Detail". Scale Models, Volume 12, Issue 139, April 1981.
 Stroud, John. "Wings of Peace:- de Havilland Albatross." Aeroplane Monthly,, Volume 18, Issue 206, June 1990.
 Thirsk, Ian.de Havilland Mosquito: An Illustrated History Volume 2. Manchester, UK: Crécy Publishing Limited, 2006. .
 Thomas, Geoffrey J. and Barry Ketely. KG 200: The Luftwaffe's Most Secret Unit. Tokyo: Hikoki Publications, 2003. .
 Wooldridge, John de L. Low Attack – The story of two Mosquito squadrons, 1940–1943. Crecy Books, England, 1993. .

Further reading 
 Anoni, Shlomo. "The Last of the Wooden Wonders: The DH Mosquito in Israeli Service". Air Enthusiast, No. 83, September–October 1999, pp. 30–51. 
 Birtles, Philip. Mosquito: A Pictorial History of the DH98. London: Jane's Publishing Company Ltd., 1980. .
 Birtles, Philip. De Havilland Mosquito: The Original Multirole Combat Aircraft. Stroud, England: Fonthill Media, 2017. .

 Gilman J.D. and J. Clive. KG 200. London: Pan Books, 1978. .
 Hardy, M.J. The de Havilland Mosquito. Devon, UK/New York: David & Charles (Publishers) Ltd./Arco Publishing, 1977. , (David & Charles)  (Arco).
 Hinchcliffe, Peter. The Other Battle: Luftwaffe Night Aces vs Bomber Command. London: Zenith Press, 1996. .
 Holliday, Joe. Mosquito! The Wooden Wonder Aircraft of World War II. Toronto: Doubleday, 1970. .
 Howe, Stuart. Mosquito Portfolio. London: Ian Allan Ltd., 1984. .
 Jackson, Robert. de Havilland Mosquito (Combat Legend). Shrewsbury, UK: Airlife Publishing Ltd., 2003. .
 Jones, R.C. de Havilland Mosquito: RAF Northern Europe 1936–45. London: Ducimus Books Ltd., 1970.
 Mason, Francis K. and Richard Ward. De Havilland Mosquito in RAF-FAA-RAAF-SAAF-RNZAF-RCAF-USAAF-French & Foreign Service. Canterbury, Kent, UK: Osprey Publishing Ltd., 1972. .
 McKee, Alexander. The Mosquito Log. London: Souvenir Press Ltd., 1988. .
 Morgan, Hugh and John Weal. German Jet Aces of World War 2. London: Osprey Publishing Ltd, 1998. .
 Price, Nigel (ed.). "Mosquito: A Celebration of de Havilland's 'Wooden Wonder'." FlyPast Special. Stamford, Lincolnshire, UK: Key Publishing Ltd., 2009.
 Radinger, Will and Walter Schick. Me262 (German lang. ed.), Berlin: Avantic Verlag GmbH, 1996. .
 Sasbye, Kjeld Mahler. Operation Carthage. Copenhagen: Den Danske Luftfartsskole, 1994. .
 Scholefield, R.A. Manchester Airport. Stroud, UK: Sutton Publishing, 1998. .
 Scutts, Jerry. Mosquito in Action, Part 1. Carrollton, Texas: Squadron/Signal Publications Inc., 1993. .
 Shacklady, Edward. De Havilland Mosquito (Classic WWII Aviation, Volume 6). Bristol, UK: Cerberus Publishing Ltd., 2003. .
 Stanley, Colonel Roy M. II, USAF (Ret). V-Weapons Hunt: Defeating German Secret Weapons. Barnsley, South Yorkshire, UK: Pen & Sword, 2010. .
 Sweetman, Bill and Rikyu Watanabe. Mosquito. London: Jane's Publishing Company Ltd., 1981. .

External links

 The Mosquito Page at Mossie.org
 de Havilland Aircraft Heritage Centre a.k.a. Mosquito Aircraft Museum
 Calgary Mosquito Aircraft Preservation Association
 
 Victoria Air Maintenance Ltd. Restoring a Mosquito to flying condition
 The People's Mosquito Ltd. UK charity restoring Mosquito RL249 to flight. Website features WW2 colour film of the Mosquito
 de Havilland Mosquito magazine articles and publications
 Data at Warbirdregistry.org
 Mosquito restoration project New Zealand (633 Squadron theme) Retrieved: 3 January 2012.
 Wartime film of the construction of the Mosquito in Australia Retrieved: 3 January 2012.
 "Flying Plywood With A Sting": Popular Science article, December 1943
 A close-up picture of the nose of a Tsetse Mosquito FB Mk.XVIII showing the Molins 57 mm gun muzzle
 A photograph of the Tsetse Mosquito FB Mk.XVIII NT225
 "Mosquito Wars on U-Boats With 6-pound Shells.": Popular Mechanics article, February 1945, p. 39.
 Wartime footage of Coastal Command 57mm cannon and 60lb rocket-armed Mosquitoes
 Mosquito Pathfinders, Pathfinder Museum
 627 Squadron RAF Mosquito Pathfinders Based at RAF Woodall Spa 
 Air Accidents Investigation Branch (AAIB) report on the crash of T.III G-ASKH, 1996
 IWM Image of Mosquito PR34 RG241, which holds the twin piston-engine Atlantic crossing record.
 "America Reports On Aid To Allies etc. (1942)." Universal Newsreel
 "Mosquito Makes Base" a 1943 Flight article on a Mosquito Intruder's battle damage
 "'Pin-Point' Attack On One House by Mosquitoes" a 1944 Flight advertisement
 "The Magnificent Mosquito" a 1969 Flight article by Air Commodore Allen Wheeler
 Mosquito from the IBCC Digital Archive at the University of Lincoln.

 
1940s British bomber aircraft
Mosquito
Mosquito
Mid-wing aircraft
Reconnaissance aircraft
Twin piston-engined tractor aircraft
World War II British bombers
World War II British fighter aircraft
World War II British night fighter aircraft
Aircraft first flown in 1940